Vivekanand Arts, Sardar DalipSingh Commerce And Science College, Aurangabad, is an undergraduate and postgraduate, coeducational college situated in Aurangabad, Maharashtra. It was established in the year 1971. The college is affiliated with Dr. Babasaheb Ambedkar Marathwada University.

Departments

Science
Computer Science
Physics
Mathematics
Chemistry
Biology
Biotechnology
Zoology
 Microbiology

Arts and Commerce
Marathi
English
History
Political Science
Hindi
Economics
Sociology
Commerce

Accreditation
The college is  recognized by the University Grants Commission (UGC).

References

External links
http://vivekanandcollege.edu.in

Dr. Babasaheb Ambedkar Marathwada University
Universities and colleges in Maharashtra
Educational institutions established in 1971
1971 establishments in Maharashtra